Soltrio Solitaire is an Xbox Live Arcade title developed by Silver Creek Entertainment for the Xbox 360, which is a bundle of 18 separate solitaire card games, which was released on May 16, 2007.

Gameplay 
The game supports the Xbox Live Vision camera and has 2 player multiplayer over System Link or Xbox Live, including competitive solitaire in which two players use the same foundation piles, and co-operative solitaire, in which players assist one another and pass cards over.

The game features a light roleplaying mode called "Voyage Adventure" in which the player traverses a game map to play solitaire games, which includes the ability to unlock new card elements and design customizable deck graphics.

The game featured downloadable content in the form of solitaire card game packs every two weeks until October 3, 2007, using games found in Silver Creek's Hardwood Solitaire title for Microsoft Windows and Mac OS.

Critical reception
IGN rated Soltrio as "mediocre". Some game modes, such as Memory, were criticized for being "padding". The quest mode was seen as worthless and the multiplayer Klondike-variation was deemed "sloppy and no fun". Although the competitive mode could be "spirited and fun", overall the package was described as unjustifiably expensive.

Games 
The full list of the initial group of 18 solitaire card games include:
Aces Up
Archway
Backbone
Easthaven
Forty Thieves
FreeCell Easy
FreeCell
Grandfather's Clock
Klondike Deal 3
Klondike Easy
Matrimony
Memory
Montana
Sea Towers
Spider 1 Suit
Super Flower Garden
Zodiac

Additional Content

Game Pack 1
On June 13, 2007, "Game Pack 1" added the following 10 games:

Clock
Compass Easy
Compass
Lady of the Manor
Miss Milligan
Russian Solitaire
Sir Tommy
Storehouse
Whitehead
Yin & Yang

Game Pack 2
On June 27, 2007, "Game Pack 2" added 10 more games:

Bristol
Down Under
Easthaven 2 Deck
Easthaven 3 Deck
Giant
Golf Easy
Golf
Little Milligan
Pauline
Westcliff

Game Pack 3
On July 11, 2007, "Game Pack 3" added 10 more games:

Ayers Rock
Beleaguered Castle
Betrothal
Blind Alleys Hard
Blind Alleys
Grand Duchess
Grandfather
Indian
Josephine
Number Ten

Game Pack 4
On July 25, 2007, "Game Pack 4" added 10 more games:

Black Hole
Can-Can
Cruel
Demon
Forty Thieves Open
Four Seasons Easy
Four Seasons
King Albert
L'Imperiale
La Belle Lucie

Game Pack 5
On August 8, 2007, "Game Pack 5" added 10 more games:

Little Giant
Lucas
Maria
Pas Seul
Quilt
Steps
Streets
Sultan
Trefoil
Twenty

Game Pack 6
On August 23, 2007, "Game Pack 6" added 9 more games:

Eight Off
ForeCell
Four Colors
FreeCell 2 Deck
FreeCell 3 Deck Easy
FreeCell 3 Deck
Maxel's Gambit
Monte Carlo
Penguin

Game Pack 7
On September 5, 2007, "Game Pack 7" added 10 more games:

Canfield Easy
Canfield
Klondike 2 Deck Easy
Klondike 2 Deck
Klondike 3 Deck
Superior Canfield
Xray Klondike
Yukon - Rigel's
Yukon - Two Decks
Yukon

Game Pack 8
On September 19, 2007, "Game Pack 8" added 10 more games:

Funnel Web
Plait
Rank and File
Scorpion Easy
Scorpion
Scorpio
Spider 2 Suits
Spider 4 Suits
Spike
Thumb & Pouch

Game Pack 9
On October 3, 2007, "Game Pack 9" added 10 more games:

Block Ten
Fourteen Out
Nestor
Pyramid Deal Three
Pyramid Easy
Pyramid Golf
Pyramid Seven
Pyramid
Simple Pairs
Tens

See also
Xbox Live Arcade
Xbox Live Vision

External links
Official Site
Silver Creek Entertainment
Press Release

References

2007 video games
Patience video games
Video games developed in the United States
Xbox 360 Live Arcade games
Xbox 360-only games
Xbox 360 games
Multiplayer and single-player video games